Balochistan, Baluchistan or Baluchestan (/), is a region that covers the southeastern region of the Persian Plateau, at the intersection of modern-day Pakistan, Iran and Afghanistan.
 
Balochistan may also refer to one of several modern and historical territories within that region:

 Balochistan, Pakistan, a province of Pakistan
 Baluchistan (Chief Commissioner's Province), a province of British India and a former province of Pakistan
 Baluchistan Agency, for colonial indirect rule in the former tribal region of British India
 Baluchistan States Union, a short-lived federation of princely states that formed a part of Pakistan
 Sistan and Baluchestan Province, a province of Iran
 Balochistan, Afghanistan, a region in Afghanistan

See also 
 Al Balushi, Arabian diaspora 
 Baluchestan-e Shutavar, a village in Iran